The Valentine Whitman House is an historic stone ender house on Great Road in Lincoln, Rhode Island. The house is one of the oldest surviving buildings in the state.

The large farmhouse was built around 1694. The house features a large stone chimney at one end. In 1730 the first town meeting of Smithfield (which then included modern day Lincoln) was held in the house.

Images

References and external links

Houses completed in 1694
Houses in Lincoln, Rhode Island
1694 establishments in Rhode Island